Farley Lake is a small alpine lake in Custer County, Idaho, United States, located high in the Sawtooth Mountains in the Sawtooth National Recreation Area. A trail from the Yellow Belly Lake and Pettit Lake trailheads leads towards Edith Lake via Farley Lake. These trailheads can be accessed from State Highway 75 via Sawtooth National Forest road 208.

Farley Lake is in the Sawtooth Wilderness and wilderness permit can be obtained at trailheads. The hike to Farley Lake is along the route to Toxaway Lake as well as Edith Lake, both of which are upstream of Farley Lake.

References

See also
 List of lakes of the Sawtooth Mountains (Idaho)
 Sawtooth National Forest
 Sawtooth National Recreation Area
 Sawtooth Range (Idaho)

Lakes of Idaho
Lakes of Custer County, Idaho
Glacial lakes of the United States
Glacial lakes of the Sawtooth Wilderness